Itsumi (written: 逸見) is a Japanese surname. Notable people with the surname include:

, Japanese announcer, singer and writer

Itsumi (written: 逸美) is also a feminine Japanese given name. Notable people with the name include:

, Japanese actress

Japanese feminine given names
Japanese-language surnames